Five on a Treasure Island is an 8-part 1957 British film serial made by the Children's Film Foundation, based on the novel of the same name by Enid Blyton. The author herself helped cast the film. It was filmed in Dorset, UK, at Corfe Castle, in Corfe Castle Village, the Jurassic Coast, Lulworth Cove and Stair Hole near Lulworth Cove which served as the Kirrin Island landing spot for the rowing boat in the film.
The antique store from the beginning of the film was filmed at Oliver's in 5 West Street, Corfe Castle Village, Dorset, UK.

Cast
Rel Grainer as George
Richard Palmer as Julian
Gillian Harrison as Anne
John Bailey as Dick
Daga as Timothy the Dog
Robert Cawdron as Luke Undown
Nicholas Bruce as Jim
Peter Burton as Quentin Kirrin
Iris Russell as Margaret Kirrin
Robert Dean as Cmdr. Mainbridge
John Charlesworth as Jan
Rufus Cruickshank as Captain Zachary (as Rufus Cruikshank)

Critical reception
DVD Beaver wrote "Chock-full of cliff-hangers and mystery, the popular Children's Film Foundation serial remains close to the spirit of the book...This is very highly recommended."

References

External links
 

1957 films
Children's Film Foundation
Films set on islands
Films based on children's books
Adaptations of works by Enid Blyton
1957 adventure films
British adventure films
Films scored by Jack Beaver
Films shot in Dorset
1950s British films